Bryon Bishop (born May 24, 1986) is a former American football offensive lineman. He played on the offensive line for the University of North Carolina. He was signed as a free agent by the Jacksonville Sharks in 2011.

External links
 Jacksonville Sharks Bio

1986 births
Living people
People from Union, South Carolina
American football offensive guards
North Carolina Tar Heels football players
Orlando Predators players
Jacksonville Sharks players
Players of American football from South Carolina